Jeal Point is a point in the U.S. state of Washington.

Jeal Point was named after Herbert Jeal, a pioneer settler.

References

Landforms of Thurston County, Washington
Headlands of Washington (state)